Damiano Ferronetti (born 1 November 1984) is an Italian footballer who plays as a left back. He can also play as a defensive midfielder.

Club career
Ferronetti started his football career with A.S. Roma. He was loaned to Serie B team U.S. Triestina Calcio for the 2003–04 season.

Parma
In summer 2004, he was involved in Matteo Ferrari transfer, which half of the registration rights was sold to Parma F.C., for €750,000.

In June 2007, all of the rights was bought by Parma by a sum of €350,000.

Udinese
In August 2007 Ferronetti was sold to Udinese Calcio for €2 million, with  Damiano Zenoni moved to Parma for €3 million.

In 2008–09 season, he competed the right-back position with Marco Motta as the left back were occupied by Aleksandar Luković and Giovanni Pasquale. In 2009–11 seasons he never played for two anterior cruciate ligaments injury, in the same knee.

Genoa
 He was signe by Genoa C.F.C. on 31 August in a one-year deal.

Ternana
On 8 August 2013 Ferronetti was signed by Ternana in a one-year contract. His contract was renewed on 1 August 2014.

International career
Ferronetti was a member of the Italy under-21 squad that took part at the 2006 UEFA European Under-21 Football Championship, but did not play any matches during the tournament. He started his national career at 2001 UEFA European Under-16 Championship (now renamed to U17 event but with the same age limit)

Footnotes

External links
FIGC 
 

1984 births
Living people
People from Albano Laziale
Italian footballers
A.S. Roma players
U.S. Triestina Calcio 1918 players
Parma Calcio 1913 players
Udinese Calcio players
Torino F.C. players
Genoa C.F.C. players
Ternana Calcio players
Serie A players
Serie B players
Association football midfielders
Italy under-21 international footballers
Italy youth international footballers
Footballers from Lazio
Sportspeople from the Metropolitan City of Rome Capital